Bassman may refer to:

Fender Bassman, bass amplifier
1st Bassman, album by Paul Chambers

People
Bassman (surname)

See also
 Baseman (disambiguation), one of several fielding positions in softball and baseball